Thomas Davidson (17 May 181714 October 1885) was a British palaeontologist.

Biography
He was born in Edinburgh. His parents possessed considerable landed property in Midlothian. Educated partly in the University of Edinburgh and partly in France, Italy and Switzerland, and early acquiring an interest in natural history, he benefited greatly by acquaintance with foreign languages and literature, and with men of science in different countries.

He was induced in 1837, through the influence of Leopold von Buch, to devote his special attention to the brachiopoda, and in course of time he became the highest authority on this group. The great task of his life was the Monograph of British Fossil Brachiopoda, published by the Palaeontographical Society (1850–1886). This work, with supplements, comprises six quarto volumes with more than 200 plates drawn on stone by the author.
He also prepared an exhaustive memoir on Recent Brachiopoda, published by the Linnean Society. He monographed the entire series of Brachiopoda collected by HMS Challenger.

Davidson benefited from an introduction to Elizabeth Gray by John Young in 1865. Gray had a lifelong interest in the fossils of Girvan in Scotland. Her family took their holidays there each year and they would devote their time to gathering cleaning and labelling fossils. Gray had some basic geology training, but she preferred to let others do the scientific descriptions. Gray would send collections of fossils, including brachiopoda, regularly over several years between 1867 and 1885.

He was elected fellow of the Geological Society of London in 1852 and in 1865 awarded their Wollaston medal. He was elected Fellow of the Royal Society in 1857, and in 1870 received a Royal medal from the Royal Society. In 1882, the degree of LL.D. was conferred upon him by the University of St Andrews. In 1866, he was elected as a member to the American Philosophical Society.

Davidson died at Brighton on 14 October 1885, bequeathing his fine collection of recent and fossil brachiopoda to the British Museum. He was buried in the churchyard of St Peter's Church, Twineham. (His son, William Davidson, had inherited Hickstead Place and the Manor of Twineham through his wife, the daughter of John Wood, of Hickstead Place.)

Monograph of British Fossil Brachiopoda

This was published in multiple parts in the series Monographs of the Palaeontographical Society in Volumes IV to XXXIX, not always in sequence. Volume numbers within the brachiopod monograph are shown below with arabic numerals, e.g. Vol. 4, while volume numbers of the series are shown with roman numerals, e.g. Volume IV.
Vol. 1. The Tertiary, Cretaceous, Oolitic and Liassic Brachiopods
Introduction to Vol. 1, Volume VII, 1853
Part 1, Tertiary, Volume VI, 1852
Part 2, No 1, Cretaceous, Volume VI, 1852
Part 2, No 2, Cretaceous, with Appendix and Index to Vol. 1, Volume VIII, 1854
Part 3, No 1, Oolitic and Liassic, Volume IV, 1850
Part 3, No 2, Oolitic and Liassic, Volume VI, 1852
Vol. 2. The Permian and Carboniferous Brachiopods
Part 4, Permian, Volume X, 1856
Part 5, No 1, Carboniferous, Volume X, 1856
Part 5, No 2, Carboniferous, Volume XI, 1857
Part 5, No 3, Carboniferous, Volume XII, 1858
Part 5, No 4, Carboniferous, Volume XIII, 1859
Part 5, No 5, Carboniferous, Volume XIV, 1860
Vol. 3. The Devonian and Silurian Brachiopods
Part 6, No 1, Devonian, Volume XVI, 1862
Part 6, No 2, Devonian, Volume XVII, 1863
Part 7, No 1, Silurian, Volume XIX, 1865
Part 7, No 2, Silurian, Volume XX, 1866
Part 7, No 3, Silurian, Volume XXII, 1868
Part 7, No 4, Silurian, Volume XXIV, 1870
Vol. 4. Supplements Tertiary to Carboniferous
Part 1 (Tertiary and Cretaceous), Volume XXVII, 1873
Part 2, No 1 (Jurassic and Triassic), Volume XXX, 1876
Part 2, No 2 (Jurassic and Triassic), Volume XXXII, 1878
Part 3 (Permian and Carboniferous), Volume XXXIV, 1880
Part 4 (Devonian and Silurian, from Budleigh Salterton pebble beds), Volume XXXV, 1881
Part 5 (Conclusion), Volume XXXVI, 1882
Vol. 5. Supplements, Devonian and Silurian
Part 1 (Devonian and Silurian), Volume XXXVI, 1882
Part 2 (Silurian), Volume XXXVII, 1883
Part 3 (Conclusion), Volume XXXVIII, 1884
Vol. 6. Bibliography
Volume XXXIX 1885

Other Publications

Notes

References
Attribution:
 
  This work in turn cites:
 Biography with portrait and list of papers in 

1817 births
1885 deaths
Scottish geologists
Scottish palaeontologists
Scientists from Edinburgh
Fellows of the Royal Society
Royal Medal winners
Wollaston Medal winners
Alumni of the University of Edinburgh